Annette W. Coleman is a Stephen T. Olney Professor Emerita of Natural History at Brown University, where she is a faculty member in the Department of Molecular Biology, Cell Biology and Biochemistry.

Biography
Her work examines "...the nature, quantity and mode of distribution of DNA genomes of mitochondria and plastids," as well as  "...the species problem, how separate species evolve. The work examines particular species and genera of the volvocales, freshwater green algae, brown algae, and abalones, and the analysis includes mating compatibility, chromosome number, and DNA relatedness as determined by sequencing."

Coleman attended Barnard College, graduating with an A.B. in 1955, and earned her doctorate in plant science at Indiana University in 1958. She was a Guggenheim Fellow in natural sciences and plant sciences in 1983.

Selected works

Books
.

Book chapters
. 
.

Journal papers
.
.
.

References

External links 
 Researchers @ Brown profile
 Brown Department of Molecular Biology, Cell Biology and Biochemistry

Year of birth missing (living people)
Living people
American women biologists
Barnard College alumni
Indiana University alumni
Brown University faculty
American women academics
21st-century American women